Theodor  P. von Brand (June 5, 1927 in Erlangen, Germany – November 15, 2004 in Thurmont, Maryland), (German notation Theodor Philipp Rudolf Freiherr von Brand zu Neidstein) was an American judge descending from a German noble family.

Biography 
Von Brand was born in the German university city of Erlangen as the son of the renowned biochemist Theodor von Brand, who was dismissed from his positions as a professor in 1933 due to his opposition to the ruling National socialists. The family came to Maryland in 1936. Von Brand joined the US Navy in 1944. After his return, his four-year studies at Brown University were financed by the Navy. Later, he served in the US Army in the occupation forces in post-war Germany. He completed his studies by earning his law degree in 1954 from George Washington University in Washington D.C.

Von Brand worked for almost fifteen years on antitrust cases at the Federal Trade Commission in Washington, D.C. During his legal career he also worked at the Social Security Administration, where he presided over black-lung disability cases brought by Appalachian coal miners. At the Interstate Commerce Commission, he ruled on the need for oversight of credit bureaus. Until his retirement, he served as an administrative law judge for the US Department of Labor where he presided over whistleblower cases concerning issues such as the rights of employees complaining of health risks in the workplace and the rights of California farmworkers to adequate working conditions.

He is the father of Andrew and Alexander von Brand and Eleanor Harris.

Von Brand was a descendant of the noble German Brand(t) family. In 1979, he inherited the castle Neidstein in the Upper Palatinate from his uncle Dr. Philipp Theodor Freiherr von Brand. Neidstein was the residence of the Brandt family since 1466. The castle became more known in 2006 when von Brand's heirs sold it to the American actor Nicolas Cage.

References 

1927 births
2004 deaths
United States Department of Labor officials
Brown University alumni
George Washington University Law School alumni
20th-century American judges
German emigrants to the United States
Federal Trade Commission personnel
People of the Interstate Commerce Commission
Social security in the United States
United States Army soldiers
Workers' rights activists
Occupational safety and health law
German resistance members
United States Navy sailors